Cedar River is the name of three rivers in the U.S. state of Michigan:

 Cedar River (Antrim County, Michigan), rising in Chestonia Township and flowing mostly west into the Intermediate River in Bellaire 
 Cedar River (Gladwin County, Michigan), rising in northeast Clare County and northwest Gladwin County and flowing into the Tobacco River in Beaverton
 Cedar River (Menominee County, Michigan), in the northern part of Menominee County, flowing mostly south and east into the Bay of Green Bay at the town of Cedar River

See also 
 Cedar River, Michigan, a community in Cedarville Township, Menominee County
 Red Cedar River (Michigan), tributary of the Grand River
 Little Cedar River (Menominee River), in Menominee County
 Little Cedar River (Tobacco River), in Gladwin County
 Cedar Creek (Michigan)
 Cedar River (disambiguation)

Rivers of Michigan
Set index articles on rivers of Michigan